The 1929 East Tennessee State Teachers football team was an American football team that represented East Tennessee State Teacher's College—now known as East Tennessee State University (ETSU)—as an independent in the 1929 college football season. They were led by fifth-year coach John Robinson. Robinson was assisted by William "Willie" Flinn Rogers, who taught history and government at the school from 1925 to 1968. This was Robinson's final year coaching the team, and his squad finished with a 2–5–1 record.

Schedule

References

East Tennessee State Teachers
East Tennessee State Buccaneers football seasons
East Tennessee State Teachers football